Lyces fornax is a moth of the family Notodontidae first described by Herbert Druce in 1885. It is found at mid-elevations on the eastern slopes of the Andes from Ecuador to Bolivia.

Larvae have been reared on Passiflora ligularis.

External links
Species page at Tree of Life Web Project

Notodontidae
Moths described in 1885